Heavens Above may refer to:

Heavens Above!, a 1963 film starring Peter Sellers and William Hartnell
Heavens-Above, a non-profit satellite tracking organization